The Morocco Tennis Tour – Rabat is a professional tennis tournament played on outdoor red clay courts. It is part of the Association of Tennis Professionals (ATP) Challenger Tour. It was held annually in Rabat, Morocco, from 2007 to 2012.

Past finals

Singles

Doubles

References

External links
Morocco Tennis Tour official website
ITF search

 
ATP Challenger Tour
Clay court tennis tournaments
Tennis tournaments in Morocco
Sport in Rabat
Recurring sporting events established in 2007